Cityscape Global is the world's largest property development networking exhibition and conference. It is a trade show for the real estate industry in Saudi Arabia. Attendees include regional and international investors, developers, architects and designers, governmental authorities, and people involved in the design and construction of both public and private real estate developments. Over 150 local, regional and international real estate firms exhibit their projects and services at the exhibition at the Riyadh International Convention and Exhibition Center. It is organised by Informa Exhibitions. Sister events of Cityscape global are Cityscape Abu Dhabi, Cityscape Egypt, Cityscape Riyadh, Cityscape Jeddah, Cityscape Qatar, Latin America and Cityscape Asia.

Companies and individuals like real estate developers, cities & regional authorities, real estate investors, financial consultants, banks, fund managers, financial institutions, investment companies, pension funds, REITs, venture capitalists, insurance companies, hedge funds, fund management companies, private equity investors, asset management companies, architects, designers and urban planners exhibit their product and services during the event.

The event is visited by investors, banks and financial institutions, commercial & residential property developers, high-net-worth (HNW) individuals, property advisers, architects, designers, real estate portfolio managers, project managers and directors, municipal & regional government authorities, construction companies, senior executives of key organisations involved in the design and construction.

Awards

Cityscape Awards 
The Awards reward architecture and design from the emerging regions of the Persian Gulf States, the Middle East, Africa, Latin America and Asia (excluding Japan, New Zealand and Australia) and recognizes Architects and their project designs, performance, vision and achievement in the key areas of architecture.

 Award Categories 

 Commercial Project Award
 Mixed Use Project Award
 Leisure & Tourism Project Award
 Residential Project Award
 Winner - Varyap - 2014
 Winner - Experion Developers - 2013 
 Retail Project Award
 Sustainability Project Award

Retail City Awards 
The Awards recognizes achievements that have contributed to the growth and development of the retail industry.

References 

Events in Dubai
Trade fairs in the United Arab Emirates
Recurring events established in 2002
2002 establishments in the United Arab Emirates